Dalila Jakupović and Nadiia Kichenok were the defending champions, but Kichenok chose to compete in Stuttgart instead. Jakupović played alongside Irina Khromacheva, but lost in the first round to Natela Dzalamidze and Anna Kalinskaya.

Liang Chen and Zhang Shuai won the title, defeating Xenia Knoll and Anna Smith in the final, 6–4, 6–4.

Seeds

Draw

Draw

References

External Links
 Main Draw

Istanbul Cup - Doubles
2018 Doubles
2018 in Istanbul
2018 in Turkish tennis
İstanbul